A repeater is a telecommunications device that receives a signal and retransmits it.

Repeater may also refer to:

 Repeater (album) 1990 album and song by post-hardcore band Fugazi
 Repeater (band), a band from Long Beach, California
 Repeater crossbow, a crossbow that combines bow spanning, bolt placing, and shooting into a single motion.
 Repeater (firearm), a firearm capable of repeated firing between each manual ammunition reload
 Repeater (G.I. Joe), a fictional character in the G.I. Joe universe
 Repeater (horology), complication in a mechanical clock that repeats chimes of the hour
 Repeater hub, an Ethernet network component
 Repeater (student), a student repeating a grade
 Repeaters, a 2010 Canadian film
 Akete or repeater, a drum used in the Nyahbingi music of Jamaica

See also
 
 Repeat (disambiguation)
 Repetition (disambiguation)